Richard Rathbone (2 December 1788 – 10 November 1860) was a member of the noted Rathbone family of Liverpool in England.

Life
Rathbone was the second son of William Rathbone IV. Richard was a commission merchant, setting up in partnership with his brother, William Rathbone V in 1809.

On 8 April 1817 Rathbone married his half-cousin, the illustrator and writer, Hannah Mary (5 July 1798 – 26 March 1878), daughter of Joseph Reynolds of Ketley, Shropshire, and granddaughter of Richard Reynolds. Richard devoted a lot of his time to the family business, which concerned his wife.

He retired in 1835. As a committed opponent of the slave trade, he published in 1836 Letter to the President of the Liverpool Anti-Slavery Society.

Rathbone attended the 1840 anti-slavery convention in London and he was included in the painting which is now in the National Portrait Gallery in London.

Rathbone and his wife six children:
 Hannah Mary (1818–1853)
 Richard Reynolds (1820–1898)
 Margaret (b. 1821 later Dixon)
 William Benson (1826–1892)
 Basil (1824–1853)
 Emily (1838–1907, later Greg)

References

1788 births
1860 deaths
English abolitionists
Businesspeople from Liverpool
Richard
19th-century British businesspeople